Passing Days (Idu dani) is a 1970 Croatian film directed by Fadil Hadžić, starring Ivica Vidović.

External links
 
 As Days Pass By / Dnevi tečejo / Idu dani at Slovenian Film Centre
 Passing Days on FilmAffinity

Synopsis 

1970 films
1970s Croatian-language films
Films directed by Fadil Hadžić
Jadran Film films
Croatian comedy films
1970 comedy films
Yugoslav comedy films